NGC 620 is a spiral galaxy located in the constellation Andromeda about 123 million light-years from the Milky Way. It was discovered by the French astronomer Édouard Stephan in 1871.

See also 
 List of NGC objects (1–1000)

References 

Spiral galaxies
Andromeda (constellation)
0620
005990